Les Adrets-de-l'Estérel (literally Les Adrets of The Estérel) is a commune in the department of Var in the Provence-Alpes-Côte d'Azur Region of southeastern France.

It lies near Fréjus and Cannes, on the Esterel massif in southeastern France.

See also
Communes of the Var department

References

Communes of Var (department)